The 1986–87 St. Francis Terriers men's basketball team represented St. Francis College during the 1986–87 NCAA Division I men's basketball season. The team was coached by Bob Valvano, who was in his third year at the helm of the St. Francis Terriers. The Terrier's home games were played at the  Generoso Pope Athletic Complex. The team has been a member of the Northeast Conference since 1981, although at this time the conference was known as the ECAC Metro Conference.

The Terriers finished their season at 11–16 overall and 5–11 in conference play. They did not qualify for the NEC Tournament.

Roster

Schedule and results

|-
!colspan=12 style="background:#0038A8; border: 2px solid #CE1126;;color:#FFFFFF;"| Regular Season

References

St. Francis Brooklyn Terriers men's basketball seasons
St. Francis
St. Francis Brooklyn Terriers men's basketball
St. Francis Brooklyn Terriers men's basketball